"Ring Road" is a song by electronic band Underworld, and was released as a single on July 6, 2008. The song was written while Hyde was in a creative slump. He took a walk around the town and wrote down what he observed, and then converted it into a lyrical format. The song's music video depicts him walking the streets of a small town (all black and white, while he is in color), and singing the lyrics of the song.

Track listing

12": underworldlive.com, UWR000214 (UK)
 "Ring Road" (Laidback Luke Remix) – 8:09
 "Ring Road" (Fake Blood Remix) – 4:38
 "Ring Road" (Kris Menace Remix) – 7:24
 "Ring Road" (Autokratz Left Hand Drive Remix) – 5:44

References

External links
Underworldlive.com

Underworld (band) songs
2008 singles
2007 songs
Songs written by Rick Smith (musician)
Songs written by Karl Hyde